Laowai is the Pinyin pronunciation/transliteration of  (pinyin: lǎowài, lit. "old foreign"), an informal term or slang for "foreigner" and/or non-Chinese national, usually neutral but possibly impolite or loose in some circumstances. Formal and polite Chinese terms for foreigner include wàiguórén, wàibīn,  guójì yǒurén ) and wàiguó pengyou. "Laowai" is commonly used to refer to foreigners of non-Asian ethnicities. The term usually does not refer to ethnic Han of non-Chinese citizenship or other East Asian ethnicities.

Etymology

The use of the word  began in the 1980s, likely as an abbreviation of the term  (foreigner) into  plus the prefix .

As characters and words,  lǎo means "old; senior; aged";  wài means "out; outside; external; outer", and by extension various meanings including "appearance; faraway; distant; non-local; foreign; informal; other; unorthodox".

 is a common colloquial prefix of respect (partly out of the value of seniority conferred), its use dating back to some of the earliest Mandarin vernacular records. In Mandarin, the prefix is well-established enough that it is now inseparably fixed in many words, where its original meaning is lost. For example,  lǎoshī "teacher" is composed of  lǎo and  shī "teacher", and the original word for "teacher"  shī cannot be used alone. Other examples include  lǎotiānyé "(Lord of) Heavens",  lǎoxiāng "fellow townspeople",  lǎohǔ "tiger", and even  lǎoshǔ "mouse", an animal traditionally despised for its cultural character as well as its significant damages to humans.

In its active use, the prefix  lǎo is most often added to surnames to show respect in informal registers towards anyone not definitively young. This is often contrasted to another prefix  xiǎo "small; little; young", which, added to surnames, shows closeness and friendly affection in informal registers towards anyone more junior and at least slightly younger than the speaker. Another much less common and rather restricted use is attaching  to a descriptor to mark such a person, with a slightly humorous undertone. For example,  lǎowángù "a stubborn one" is composed from  wángù "stubborn".

The associations of the prefix  can be positive, indicating age or experience—such as lǎopéngyou—or respect, as in the familiar use of lǎo to denote the senior and respected members of families or to address teachers (lǎoshī). It may also be used in combination with part of a person's name (usually the family name) to refer to that person in a familiar and respectful way (for example a person with the surname 周, or Zhōu, could be referred to as 老周, literally "Old Zhōu"). This usage is reserved exclusively for adults, but implies familiarity rather than seniority, and is often attached to specific individuals as a nickname rather than being freely used.

However, in certain restricted contexts, it can also carry negative connotations of being old or aged looking, boring old —as in lǎo gǔdǒng—or of years of experience and contempt—as in lǎo dōngxi (lit. "old thing"). It may be used in the arts or in jokes with the sense of "always" or "very": a famous comedy role was named the Lǎoniān (老蔫, "Constantly Listless"). As a pun with lǎoshī "teacher", Tom Hardy was affectionately known in mainland China as Lǎoshī ( s ) partly for his perpetually shiny hair.

The character has come to be used for specific nationality as well, with lǎo- functioning as a colloquial equivalent for -guórén: lǎoměi, lǎomò; even lǎozhōng to refer to Chinese themselves.

Informality of the term
The term is not considered necessarily offensive by those who choose to use it, but it may become so from context (tone, manner, situation, etc.). Among the Chinese, the term is informal and may be used in a neutral, genial, or even good-humored way. Varyingly, it is ironically embraced, begrudgingly accepted, openly resented or not minded at all among the Western expatriate community.

The official Chinese press has expressed concern about inappropriate use of laowai and avoids it in all formal reporting.

Mark Rowswell, known under the stage name Dashan, is one of the most famous Western nationals in China's media industry and has admitted a place for the term. However, he recognizes it as pejorative and stated that "it is the foreigners [in China] who can't speak any Chinese who are truly 'laowai'". Many take that as implying that the term laowai is one that many, including Dashan himself, would prefer to avoid.

Editorials, written by Chinese and non-Chinese, have appeared in English- and Chinese-language newspapers about the subject, particularly around the time of the 2008 Summer Olympics in Beijing, when Chinese governments launched campaigns aimed at curbing use of the term in possibly-offensive situations.

See also

Ang Mo ("redhead" in Hokkien/Min Nan/Teochew)
China Hands
Gaijin ("outsider" in Japanese)
Gweilo ("ghoulie" in Cantonese)
Permanent Foreigners

References

Chinese slang
Chinese words and phrases
Ethno-cultural designations